Streetsville (pop. 47,327) is a neighbourhood located in the northwestern corner of the city of Mississauga, Ontario, Canada, on the Credit River. Although Streetsville occupies the west and east banks of the river, the majority is located on the west bank of the river.

A town prior to the 1974 amalgamations that formed the City of Mississauga, it seeks to keep a "small town" charm by retaining a variety of historical buildings and streetscapes. As part of this attempt to maintain a separate identity from the larger city, the names of two main Mississauga streets, as they pass through Streetsville, retain the names they had when Streetsville was an independent village: Mississauga Road and Bristol Road, which remain as Queen Street and Main Street respectively. Other main thoroughfares that pass through or near Streetsville include Britannia Road, Creditview Road, Eglinton Avenue, and Erin Mills Parkway.

History

Before 1800

The area surrounding the Credit River was populated by the Iroquois people up until the early 18th century, when it was taken by the Ojibwa. European settlers came to know them specifically as the Mississaugas, which eventually became the name of the area itself. By 1805, the Natives had either ceded or sold most of this land over to British governance.

Settlement

The beginnings of Streetsville are interwoven with the history of its founder, Timothy Street. Street was born in 1778 in the American colonies to a British Loyalist family. At the age of 23, he moved with his family from New York to St. David's, a settlement on the Niagara River in Upper Canada (as Ontario was then known).

Before it could be opened for settlement, the land had to be surveyed, and as was usual for the time, surveyors would receive a grant of land from the parcel that they surveyed as compensation for their work. Timothy Street, along with Richard Bristol, a qualified surveyor, applied for a contract to survey parts of the newly available land. As they did their work, Street quickly began to appreciate the immense potential for settlement along the Credit River, and made plans to erect both a saw and grist mill once his work was finished.

In April 1819, the surveyed land was opened for settlement, and the first settler in the area, James Glendinning, settled on a parcel of land along Mullet Creek. Timothy Street did build his saw and grist mills, using stones from Glendinning's land.

A large quarry of red clay lay on the west side of the village, encouraging the use of brick for construction.

In 1821, Streetsville's first general store, now known as Montreal House, was built, and still stands. Another landmark, Timothy Street's house, was built in 1825 and is one of the oldest brick houses in Peel Region.

In 1855, William Graydon and Peter Douglass built a large brick building, and sold it in 1859 to Bennet Franklin, a partner in Barber Brothers Toronto Woollen Mills. It became known as Franklin House. In 1910, under new ownership, the name was changed to the Queen's Hotel. Although it ceased to operate as a hotel when its public room was closed with the enforcement of the Canada Temperance Act, it continued to be used for commercial purposes. At present, it has been designated under the terms of the Ontario Heritage Act and protected by a heritage easement, and now houses a restaurant and a variety of small businesses and offices.

In 1858, Streetsville was incorporated as a village, with a population of 1500 people. The primary work was found in grist mills, sawmills and tanneries. Timothy Street's son, John, was the first reeve. For the next century, Streetsville largely existed as a long narrow village with all of its shops, three churches, the cenotaph and the library located on Queen Street, which ran between the Credit River and the railway track.

A century later, in 1951, the population of Streetsville had declined to 1,139 people. Then in 1953, two of the first suburbs in Canada, Vista Heights and Riverview, were built to the southwest and northeast respectively.  Vista Heights was notable because the town council made the unprecedented decision to require the developer to build a K-6 (kindergarten to Grade 6) elementary school. These suburbs and Vista Heights Public School opened in 1955, presaging the future rapid growth of middle-class suburbs in the area.

1962 incorporation and 1974 municipal reorganization
As families moved into the new suburbs, the town's population grew rapidly. By January 1962, Streetsville's population reached 5,000, and it was incorporated as a town. The first mayor was Frank Dowling.

In 1968, the creation of the Town of Mississauga amalgamated the villages and hamlets of Cooksville, Dixie, Clarkson, Erindale and Malton. Although Streetsville and Port Credit were excluded from this amalgamation, it was evident that the high population growth in the area would result in further amalgamation.

In 1974 Streetsville and Port Credit were annexed as Mississauga became a city.

Politics

Municipal 
Streetsville is a member of the eleventh ward within the city of Mississauga . Representing the ward is Councillor George Carlson, who was elected Councillor of the eleventh ward in 2000 and was re-elected in 2003, 2006, 2010 and 2014. Carlson is a direct descendant of one of Streetsville's founders, Henry Rutledge (1797–1875) who also served as a local Councillor. Prior to the annexing of Mississauga, Hazel McCallion was the mayor of Streetsville (1970–1973) and was the township's last reeve (1967–1970). She was the fourth mayor of Mississauga and Lived in Streetsville until her death on January 29, 2023 from pancreatic cancer.

Provincial
Streetsville resides in the provincial electoral district (riding) of Mississauga-Streetsville. The riding was created in 2003 after Mississauga—Erindale and Mississauga South were divided up. The riding is continued to be represented by Liberal Member of Provincial Parliament Bob Delaney. Delaney was elected in the provincial election of 2003, by defeating Progressive Conservative Nina Tangri by over 7,000 votes. In 2006, Delaney was appointed the Parliamentary Assistant to Minister Responsible for Seniors. He was re-elected in the provincial election of 2007 again, defeating Tangri by 11,155 votes. On January 25, 2010, Delaney was named Parliamentary Assistant to the Minister of Revenue.

Federal
Prior to 1993, Streetsville favoured the Conservative party with Progressive Conservative Bob Horner being elected as a Member of Parliament (MP) in the 1984 and 1988 federal elections. Since then Streetsville voters swayed towards the Liberals with the party winning the riding consecutively to this date. In 2000, Liberal MP Steve Mahoney defeated Alliance candidate Philip Leong in the Federal Mississauga-Streetsville riding and remained in office until 2003. Wajid Khan then took the riding in 2004 by beating Conservative Nina Tangri by 8,481 votes and continued onto a second term after defeating Conservative challenger Raminder Gill by 5,792 votes in 2006. During his second term, Khan served as a consultant to Stephen Harper and the Conservative Party on issues concerning the Middle East. Based on an ultimatum established by the Conservatives, Khan switched parties in 2007 and ran as a Conservative candidate in the 2008 elections. Liberal Bonnie Crombie defeated Khan in the election by 5,000 votes.

Demographics

As of 2009, Streetsville's population (whose census boundary includes surrounding areas such as East Credit and Erin Mills Central) stood at 47,327 with a 9.9% population increase between 2001 and 2006 and a subsequent 20% increase from 2006 to 2009. From 2006 to 2009, households also increased in number from 12,178 to 13,722.  The majority of Streetsville residences own their own homes (85%) with more than 51,000 residents holding a university or college degree. Also the majority of residences work within grey or white collar jobs versus only 27% of the population consisting of labour workers . Furthermore, the average household income of Streetsville residents amounts to $124,255 with only a 5.6% unemployment rate. In relation to religion, 41.4% of residents are Roman Catholics while religious populations such as Muslims (6.9%) and Anglicans (6.3%) are continuing to grow. Also nearly 48% of Streetsville residents are identified as visible minorities including predominantly East Indians, South Asians and Chinese. Subsequently, 53% of the population's main language is English while the region boasts many non-official languages such as Chinese, Arabic, and Punjabi. With homes averaging around 3.4 bedrooms, the average family consists of three people per home and has around 1.4 children. Streetsville's population has an average age of 38 with 33% of the population being between ages 25–44, 23.1% of the population are between the ages 45– 64 and 14.5% of the population being between the ages of 15- 24. Also among the population, 61.4% of residents are married while 29.1% are single and 9.5% are widowed or divorced.

Community

Streetsville as a Community Node
Streetsville is one of Mississauga's largest and most identifiable historical communities due to its suburban surroundings, which makes it stand out to a greater degree than former towns in older urban areas and is likely the reason for its nickname "The Village in the City". It still retains its historic main street and is home to many historical buildings. Streetsville is known as a Community Node, and therefore provides various resources applicable to a Community Node. The city of Mississauga focuses on Streetsville's urban structure to grow in existing and proposed services and the community infrastructure. As a Community Node, there are many things in Streetsville that are used on a day-to-day basis. This includes: local shops, restaurants, community facilities, entertainment, schools, parks, and an impressive housing stock that meets the requirements of new residents.

Bread and Honey Festival
In 1973 Streetsville held the first Bread and Honey Festival. This was an acknowledgement to the town's history and its involvement with milling as Kraft Canada and ADM Milling had well-established flourmills in the area. The festival become an annual event being held on the first weekend of June.  The festival is held at Streetsville Memorial Park. Some of the events include live musical performances, a carnival run, a consumers market, a pancake breakfast, and parade. The festival went on hiatus in 2020. It came back in 2022 as the Bread and Honey Street Festival and returning as a full festival in 2023.

Canada Day
Every July 1 at the Memorial Park dedicated to F.B. McFarren, the neighbourhood holds a local Canada Day celebration. There are various activities occurring throughout the afternoon, ranging from face-painting to dance performances. Local businesses sponsor and execute various performances throughout the evening and is then finished with a firework display occurring around 10pm.

Santa Claus Parade
The annual Mississauga Santa Claus Parade now takes place in Streetsville. The parade starts on Queen Street at Britannia Road and travels south through the village to disperse at various locations after the Church Street junction. The parade was founded in 1974.

Christmas Market

In 2016, the Streetsville BIA and City of Mississauga held its inaugural 'Christmas in the Village' Market in the Streetsville Village Square on the last weekend of November.  After a two-year Renovation in 2014, the Streetsville Village Square now includes a covered stage, the town cenotaph and outdoor seating for residents. The 'Christmas in the Village' Market includes food and gift vendors, live entertainment and the lighting of the towns Christmas Tree.

Sports

Ice hockey

The Streetsville and District Minor Hockey Association was established in 1946. Streetsville and seven other communities in the Toronto Township formed the Toronto Township Hockey League (TTHL) In 1962 the Streetsville and District Minor Hockey Association began to play in their new rink, Vic Johnston Community Centre. During the early years the Streetsville's Hockey team played under many names including, the Thunderbirds, Hounds, Tigers, Kings, and Panthers. In the 1967-68 season they left the TTHL. Streetsville iced five teams to play in the Tri-County A league of the Ontario Minor Hockey Association (OMHA) at the start of the 1968-69 season. That first season Streetsville won two championships. In the late 1980s, the President and late Bill Mann embarked on a name search for the Streetsville Rep teams. The name chosen was Tigers, and from that date on the name and team colours were adopted into the Rules and Regulations. The Tiger logo was designed and adopted in 1990 and has been incorporated into all tiger equipment, sweaters, pants, equipment bags, hats and jackets. The Tigers moved to the OMHA Central AAA league in 1991-1992 where they competed for four years. Since joining the GTHL, the Tiger teams have been very competitive winning two Divisional Champions, one Carnation Cup and one City Championship. 2006 the Streetsville Tigers Celebrated 60 years of hockey in Streetsville.

Streetsville had a successful Junior A hockey club the Streetsville Derbys which played in the Vic Johnson Arena. At the conclusion of the 2007 season, the Derbys moved to a new location, Westwood Arena, in Rexdale, Ontario. In 2011 with the Ontario Junior Hockey League's goal of contraction, the Derby's merged with the Cobourg Cougars.

Streetsville Thistles was a successful lacrosse club in the 1890s.

Vic Johnston Arena
The arena opened in 1961, and is used for hockey, skating and other community events.  It is an independent, non-profit arena.  In 2008, the arena received an $8-million-dollar renovation.

See also
Mississauga—Streetsville, electoral riding
Gagan Sikand, former MP for Mississauga—Streetsville
Nina Tangri, MPP for Mississauga—Streetsville
Streetsville Secondary School
St. Joseph Secondary School (Mississauga)
Hazel McCallion Senior Public School
Vista Heights Public School
Russell Langmaid Public School
F. B. McFarren Memorial Park
Billy Talent

Notes

External links

streetsville.ca - The Web Site in the City - Community Web Site

Neighbourhoods in Mississauga
Populated places on the Credit River